Alexia Zevnik (born March 4, 1994) is a Canadian swimmer specializing in freestyle and backstroke. She placed second behind Sian Whittaker in the 200 m backstroke at the 2017 University Games in Taipei. At the 2018 Commonwealth Games, she led her team of Kayla Sanchez, Penny Oleksiak, and Taylor Ruck to a second-place finish in the 4x100 metre freestyle relay.

References

External links
 
 
 

Living people
Swimmers at the 2018 Commonwealth Games
Swimmers at the 2019 Pan American Games
Commonwealth Games medallists in swimming
Commonwealth Games silver medallists for Canada
Universiade medalists in swimming
1994 births
Universiade gold medalists for Canada
Universiade silver medalists for Canada
Pan American Games medalists in swimming
Pan American Games silver medalists for Canada
Pan American Games bronze medalists for Canada
Medalists at the 2017 Summer Universiade
Medalists at the 2019 Pan American Games
Canadian female freestyle swimmers
Medallists at the 2018 Commonwealth Games